Novy is a rural locality (a settlement) in Volokonovsky District, Belgorod Oblast, Russia. The population was 144 as of 2010.

Geography 
Novy is located 30 km northwest of Volokonovka (the district's administrative centre) by road. Shidlovka is the nearest rural locality.

References 

Rural localities in Volokonovsky District